Malalag, officially the Municipality of Malalag, is a 2nd class municipality in the province of Davao del Sur, Philippines. According to the 2020 census, it has a population of 40,158 people.

Malalag is the agricultural center of Davao del Sur, and its main products are banana, coconut and other fruits and vegetables. Other primary industries include fishing and mining.

Etymology
Malalag derives its name from the color that describes the river running within the heart of the town.  The water flowing towards the bay appeared yellowish.  The natives referring to the river called it, “malalag nga tubig”, meaning “yellow water.”  The distinct appearance of the river attracted migrants to the place.

Some pioneers trace the town's name from a disagreement between a Spanish soldier and Datu Alag, a famous chieftain among the early tribes.  It was said that Datu Alag made an appointment with the Spaniard and promised him to be his guide. However, Datu Alag broke his promise and not one of his followers could tell where he has gone. Sensing that he had somehow been tricked, the Spanish soldier became enraged and shouted, “Mal Alag, Mal Alag.” (Bad Alag!) The tribe members confounded by his words kept on repeating it. The same story was told over the generations, so that even settlers coming from Visayas and Luzon became accustomed to calling the place Malalag.

History

Malalag Bay was previously known as Casilaran Bay, The name Malalag was applied to it some time during the Second World War after a Philippine National Police (PNP) barracks was established. The same area, now known as Crossing Baybay and adjacent to the 434th PNP Mobile Force Company barrack, was a center of commerce with Chinese traders. Also, the Malalag Wharf that is located about a kilometer away used to accommodate three to four sea vessels that loaded products for transport to Visayas.

Malalag became a municipality by virtue of Executive Order No. 596 dated May 28, 1953 issued by H.E. President Elpidio Quirino. This legal document stated that Malalag shall comprise the southern and south-eastern part of Padada and separated from its mother municipality of Padada by a straight west-to-east line passing through the Bolton Barrio Boundary Monument No. 20, Santa Cruz Cadastre 275 Davao. Its boundary on the South was redefined under Republic Act 1008 stating among others that the boundary line between the municipalities of Padada and Malalag shall be from east to west of Balasinon River from the Gulf of Davao to Km. 327 of the Digos-Malalag-Makar Road and a straight line along latitude 6°36' from the provinces of Davao and Cotabato. Even upon the creation of Sulop pursuant to Executive Order 295, the Padada-Malalag boundary as defined in R.A. 1008 was reiterated. For two decades, the boundary dispute arising from the encroachment of the Municipality of Sulop into the territory of Malalag remained unsettled.

Originally, Malalag contained the Poblacion that is the seat of the Municipal Government, Bulacan, Bolton, Santa Maria, New Baclayon and Sulop.  At present, it has fifteen (15) regular barangays: Poblacion, Baybay, Bulacan, Bolton, New Baclayon, Caputian, Bagumbayan, Ibo, Pitu, Tagansule, Kiblagon, Rizal, San Isidro, Mabini and Lapu-lapu.

The Municipality used to celebrate "Araw ng Malalag" every 2nd day of July, but by virtue of Municipal Ordinance No. 10 dated May 21, 1990, and consistent with its charter day, the celebration was transferred to May 28. On July 2, 1953, the first sets of local officials were appointed and assumed office, headed by Mayor Col. Antonio Lanzar.

Since 1954, the municipal government has been run by the following elected mayors:
Felix M. Brandares 1954 - 1959
Angel Y. Carr 1959 - 1967
Judge Godofredo Cabahug 1967 - 1971
Andres B. Montejo 1971 - 1986
Dr. Zabino P. Zantua 1986 - 1988 (Appointed under the revolutionary government)
Andres B. Montejo 1988 - 1998
Givel M. Mamaril 1998–2007
Roel O. Paras 2007 – 2016
Peter Paul T. Valentin 2016–present

Malalag also harbors a "Lumad" tribe called "Tagakaolo". It comes from the phrase “olo sa tubig” which means inhabitants of headwater. These places have been the favored dwellings of the Kaolos.

Their traditional territories are in Davao Del Sur and the Sarangani Province. The Tagakaolo tribe originally came from the western shores of the gulf of Davao and south of Mt. Apo a long time ago.

In 1955, the barrios of Basiawan, Kibulan and the sitios of Kimatay and Kilalag were transferred from the town of Malita, Davao del Sur, to Malalag.

Geography

Climate

Barangays
Malalag is politically subdivided into 15 barangays.

Demographics
	

The municipality in 1970 had a total population of 34,764 and in the 1980 official result it had a total of 44,690.  In 1983, upon the court decision for case 1212 Boundary disputes between the Provinces of South Cotabato and Davao del Sur, there were 6 barangays in the Municipality of Malalag transferred to Malungon, South Cotabato. Consequently, there was a sudden decreased in population during the 1990 census. The population gradually increased from 27,709 in 1990 to 35,241 in 2007.

Population and number of households by barangay

As of the 2007 census, the municipality had a total registered population of 35,241 with a total of 7,477 corresponding households. Out of the 15 barangays comprising Malalag, Barangay Poblacion has the largest population in the entire municipality (population 6,105) and the highest number of households (1,240 households), followed by the barangays of Bulacan (population 4,277), Baybay (population 3,619) and New Baclayon (population 3,483). Other barangays are moderately populated. Three barangays were identified as urban with a total population of 11,939: Poblacion, Baybay and Bagumbayan. The rural areas at present have a total population of 23,302 with 11 component rural barangays. The barangay of Bulacan is the largest among the rural barangays with a total population of 4,277 followed by Mabini and New Baclayon.

Economy

Agriculture: Among agricultural crops, coconut leads in production followed by banana and sugarcane. Other major crops are corn and vegetables. The municipality also produces high value fruits like mango. Cattle leads in livestock production.

Fisheries: The long coastline of Malalag which forms part of Davao Gulf provides a rich fishing grounds.

Forestry: Tropical evergreen and other timber cover the vast timberland and forest area. Rattan, bamboo and other vines are also in abundance.

Mining: Deposits of copper and or limestone were also traced but still have to be tapped for commercial and industrial uses. The Sagittarius Mines Inc. (SMI) has picked Davao del Sur to host the supporting infrastructure for the $5.9-billion Tampakan copper-gold project and identified Malalag as the preferred site for the PPFP (Port, Power Station and Filter Plant Project) development.

Malalag Wharf

Port facilities include:
 50m wharf
 One berth, 30m x 15m
 Controlling depth of 9m - 12m below MLLW
 Fendering system is of clustered timber files distributed equally alongside the wharf
 Tanks and pipelines for shipment of molasses

Malalag Arrastre Porters and Stevedoring Multi-Purpose Coop (MAPOSTMUCO) are the cargo handling operators of general cargoes such as molasses, sugar, steel products, vehicle and heavy equipment.

Approach for Malalag Wharf is through the Malalag Bay. Ships can anchor at a depth of 21 fathoms free of hazardous underwater obstructions/currents and is notably sheltered from direct exposure to the open sea. Vessels entering the Malalag Port navigate through the south-west route of the Malalag Bay which is a tributary of the larger Davao Gulf waters.

References

External links

 Malalag Profile at the DTI Cities and Municipalities Competitive Index
 [ Philippine Standard Geographic Code]
 National Statistical Coordination Board: Data on Malalag
 Philippine Census Information
 Local Governance Performance Management System

Municipalities of Davao del Sur
Establishments by Philippine executive order